Steve Webster may refer to:
Steve Webster (sidecar racer) (born 1960), English sidecar racer
Steve Webster (golfer) (born 1975), English golfer
Steve Webster (bassist) (born 1958), Canadian bassist

See also
Stephen Webster (born 1959), British jewellery designer
Stephen W. Webster (born 1943), Vermont attorney and politician